Christ Hamilton United Lutheran Church and Cemetery is a national historic district consisting of a Lutheran / Reformed church and cemetery in Hamilton Township, Monroe County, Pennsylvania.  The church was built in 1829, and is a -story, fieldstone building measuring 50 feet by 40 feet.  It features a slate roof and rectangular steeple with delicate spire. Church records indicate that the cemetery was laid out in 1775, making it the oldest cemetery in Stroudsburg. The cemetery has 105 limestone headstones inscribed mostly in German.  Burials date from 1793 to 1875. Fraktur artist Johann Adam Eyer was a clerk and teacher at the church.

The church and cemetery were added to the National Register of Historic Places in 1980.

References

External links
Official website
Christ Hamilton Lutheran Cemetery at Find A Grave

Cemeteries in Pennsylvania
Churches on the National Register of Historic Places in Pennsylvania
Historic districts on the National Register of Historic Places in Pennsylvania
Churches completed in 1829
19th-century Lutheran churches in the United States
Protestant Reformed cemeteries
Churches in Monroe County, Pennsylvania
National Register of Historic Places in Monroe County, Pennsylvania
Lutheran cemeteries in the United States
1829 establishments in Pennsylvania